Geoff Cayzer (born 7 August 1945) is a former Australian rules footballer who played for St Kilda in the Victorian Football League (VFL).

In the opening round of the 1967 VFL season, against Footscray at Moorabbin Oval, Cayzer made his league debut and kicked three goals. He made two further appearances that year and the following season joined Latrobe where he was a member of their 1969 and 1970 NWFU premiership teams.

A left footer, Cayzer was given another opportunity by St Kilda in 1971 but could only manage to break into the seniors once. He returned to Latrobe in 1972 for another premiership and represented Tasmania in the 1975 Knockout Carnival.

Cayzer is now the managing director at Cayzer Real Estate in Melbourne.

References

Holmesby, Russell and Main, Jim (2007). The Encyclopedia of AFL Footballers. 7th ed. Melbourne: Bas Publishing.

1945 births
Living people
St Kilda Football Club players
Latrobe Football Club players
Caulfield Grammarians Football Club players
Australian rules footballers from Victoria (Australia)